This is a list of notable journals related to medical and health informatics.

BMC Medical Informatics and Decision Making 
Computers in Biology and Medicine
Health Informatics Journal
International Journal of Medical Informatics
Journal of the American Medical Informatics Association
Journal of Biomedical Informatics 
Journal of Information Professionals in Health 
Journal of Innovation in Health Informatics 
Journal of Medical Internet Research 
Medical & Biological Engineering & Computing
Methods of Information in Medicine
PLOS Digital Health 
Statistics in Medicine

References

See also
List of medical journals
Lists of academic journals

 
Health
Health informatics
Medical and health informatics
Medical health j